The South American Youth Championship 1981 was held in Guayaquil and Quito, Ecuador. It also served as qualification for the 1981 FIFA World Youth Championship.

Teams
The following teams entered the tournament:

 
 
 
 
 
  (host)
 
 
 
(Peru withdrew due to the Paquisha War)

First round

Group A

Group B

Final round

Qualification to World Youth Championship
The two best performing teams qualified directly for the 1981 FIFA World Youth Championship.

 
 

Argentina also qualified, after winning an intercontinental play-off against New Zealand and Israel. Matches were played in Buenos Aires, Argentina.

External links
Results by RSSSF

South American Youth Championship
1981 in youth association football